Hammock Park is a natural area with trails, boardwalks, butterfly garden, disc golf course, picnic area and playground in Dunedin, Florida. Volunteers have worked to clear the park of air potato (Dioscorea bulbifera). The park is located at 1900 San Mateo Drive. Andrews Memorial Chapel is located next to the park.

References

Parks in Pinellas County, Florida
Dunedin, Florida